Etterbeek railway station is a railway station in Brussels, Belgium operated by SNCB. The station is named after the municipality of Etterbeek though it is located in the neighbouring municipality of Ixelles, at the Couronne/Kroon crossroad on the greater ring. It first opened in 1880, and was as of 2007 the 29th most used railway station in Belgium, with 5,565 passengers per day. In 2014 the station was used by 4,766 passengers on weekdays.

The Etterbeek railway station is located on the line 161 Brussels - Namur, between the stations Germoir/Mouterij and Watermaal. Some trains from line 26 also call at this station between Delta and Boondael.

Train services
The station is served by the following service(s):

Intercity services (IC-17) Brussels Airport - Brussels-Luxembourg - Namur - Dinant (weekdays)
Intercity services (IC-17) Brussels - Namur - Dinant (weekends)
Intercity services (IC-18) Brussels - Namur - Liege (weekdays)
Intercity services (IC-27) Brussels Airport - Brussels-Luxembourg - Nivelles - Charleroi (weekdays)
Brussels RER/GEN services (S4) Vilvoorde - Merode - Etterbeek - Brussels-Luxembourg - Denderleeuw - Aalst (weekdays, peak hours only)
Brussels RER/GEN services (S5) Mechelen - Brussels-Luxembourg - Etterbeek - Halle - Enghien (- Geraardsbergen) (weekdays)
Brussels RER/GEN services (S8) Brussels - Etterbeek - Ottignies - Louvain-le-Neuve
Brussels RER/GEN services (S9) Leuven - Brussels-Luxembourg - Etterbeek - Braine-l'Alleud (weekdays, peak hours only)
Brussels RER/GEN services (S81) Schaarbeek - Brussels-Luxembourg - Etterbeek - Ottignies (weekdays, peak hours only)

References

Etterbeek
Ixelles
Railway stations in Brussels
Railway stations opened in 1880